Le Gage Pratt (December 14, 1852 – March 9, 1911) was an American businessman and politician who served as a U.S. Representative from New Jersey for one term from 1907 to 1909.

Early life and career
Born in Sterling, Massachusetts, Pratt was educated in the common schools.
In 1869, he began a commercial career in Boston.
He subsequently moved with his parents to Chicago, Illinois, where he engaged in newspaper work in Chicago 1884-1886.
He was employed for several years in the life insurance business in Texas.
He was subsequently transferred to Illinois and Nebraska and continued in that business.

In 1897, he tendered his resignation and moved to East Orange, New Jersey, where in 1903 he accepted a position with the Mutual Benefit Life Insurance Company at Newark, New Jersey. He was named company vice president, an office he held until elected to Congress.

Congress
Pratt was elected as a Democrat to the Sixtieth Congress (March 4, 1907 – March 3, 1909).  While in office, he investigated allegations of kickbacks during the construction of the Panama Canal.  
He was an unsuccessful candidate for reelection in 1908 to the Sixty-first Congress.
He resumed the insurance business and became connected with the Puritan Life Insurance Co., of Providence, Rhode Island.

Death
He died in Newark, New Jersey, March 9, 1911.
He was interred in Fairmount Cemetery in Newark.

References

External links

1852 births
1911 deaths
Democratic Party members of the United States House of Representatives from New Jersey
Burials at Fairmount Cemetery (Newark, New Jersey)
Politicians from East Orange, New Jersey
People from Sterling, Massachusetts
19th-century American politicians